The Delhi Sarai Rohilla - Bikaner SF Express is a Express train belonging to Indian Railways - North Western Railway zone that runs between Bikaner Junction and Delhi Sarai Rohilla in India.

It operates as train number 12456 from Bikaner Junction to Delhi Sarai Rohilla and as train number 12455 in the reverse direction serving the states of Rajasthan, Haryana and Delhi.

Coach composite

The train has standard ICF rakes with max speed of 110 kmph. The train consists of 15 coaches viz.,  1 AC First-class,  2 AC II Tier,  3 AC III Tier,  5 Sleeper Coaches, 2 General &  2 Second-class Luggage/parcel van.

Notes

See also 

 Delhi Sarai Rohilla railway station
 Bikaner Junction railway station
 Delhi Sarai Rohilla - Bikaner Superfast Express(via Churu)
 Bikaner Delhi Sarai Rohilla Intercity Express

References

External links 

 12455/Delhi Sarai Rohilla - Bikaner SF Express (via Sri Ganganagar)
 12456/Bikaner - Delhi Sarai Rohilla SF Express (via Sri Ganganagar)

Transport in Bikaner
Transport in Delhi
Express trains in India
Rail transport in Haryana
Rail transport in Delhi
Rail transport in Punjab, India
Rail transport in Rajasthan
Railway services introduced in 2011